Rodolfo O. de la Garza (August 17, 1942 – August 5, 2019) was an American political scientist.

De la Garza was born in Tucson, Arizona, on August 17, 1942. He attended Tucson High School, graduating in 1960 and earned a doctorate from the University of Arizona in 1972. He then worked for the United States Agency for International Development in South America. De la Garza began his teaching career at the University of Texas at El Paso, and later moved to the University of Texas at Austin, where he was Mike Hogg Professor of Community Affairs. In 2001, de la Garza joined the Columbia University faculty. At Columbia, he was appointed Eaton Professor of Administrative Law and Municipal Science. De la Garza died in New York City on August 5, 2019.

References

1942 births
2018 deaths
American political scientists
Writers from Tucson, Arizona
University of Arizona alumni
Columbia University faculty
University of Texas at Austin faculty
University of Texas at El Paso faculty
20th-century American male writers
20th-century American non-fiction writers
21st-century American male writers
21st-century American non-fiction writers
Tucson High School alumni